Dr. Rajat Subhra Hazra is an Indian mathematician specialising in probability theory. He was awarded the Shanti Swarup Bhatnagar Prize for Science and Technology, the highest science award in India, for the year 2020 in mathematical science category. He is affiliated to Indian Statistical Institute, Kolkata. Dr. Hazra has a very broad range of research interests including extreme value theory, regular variation, random matrices, free probability, Gaussian free fields, branching random walks, membrane models, random graphs, etc.

He is well known for his out of the box analysis of day to day events. A recent example came into limelight when he asked an exam question with  Covfefe, a word that featured in US President Donald Trump’s tweet for random sequence of letters.

He is an elected Fellow of Indian Academy of Sciences.

Selected Bibliography

Articles

References

External links

Living people
Year of birth missing (living people)
21st-century Indian mathematicians
Recipients of the Shanti Swarup Bhatnagar Award in Mathematical Science
Scientists from Kolkata